Stamnan is a village in the Orkdalen valley in the municipality of Rennebu in Trøndelag county, Norway.

References

Villages in Trøndelag
Rennebu